Dichilanthe zeylanica is a species of flowering plant in the family Rubiaceae. It is endemic to Sri Lanka. It is a tree that grows in evergreen forest habitat.

References

External links
Dichilanthe zeylanica. The Plant List.
Dichilanthe zeylanica isotype. JSTOR Global Plants.

Guettardeae
Endemic flora of Sri Lanka